The 2005 FIA GT Monza Supercar 500 was the first race for the 2005 FIA GT Championship season.  It took place on 10 April 2005 at the Autodromo Nazionale Monza.

Official results
Class winners in bold.  Cars failing to complete 70% of winner's distance marked as Not Classified (NC).

Statistics
 Pole Position – #16 JMB Racing – 1:45.699
 Fastest Lap – #10 Vitaphone Racing Team – 1:46.077
 Average Speed – 188.27 km/h

External links
 Official Results
 Race results

M
FIA GT